Song Lingling (born 17 January 1996) is a Chinese Paralympic swimmer competing in the S6 class. She has won two silver and a gold paralympic medal.

Life
Song was born in 1996 and she lost the use of her legs due to polio. She took up swimming in Shenyang in 2009 and her club coach was Li Jianhui. Her swimming hero was Ning Zetao. In 2010 at the IPC Swimming World Championships at Eindhoven in the Netherlands she gained a silver and a bronze medal swimming freestyle and a gold medal in the 4x50m medley. At the 2012 Summer Paralympics in London she won a silver medal in the SB5 100 m backstroke (S6).

At the 2016 Summer Paralympics in Rio she won a gold medal in the 100m backstroke (S6). Her team mate Lu Dong took the silver. In the 200 metres she took another silver medal after being beaten by Ellie Simmonds of Great Britain.

Song was at the World Para Swimming Allianz Championships in 2019 in London. She was the world record holder and she competed in the 100m backstroke S6 and took silver to the gold gained by Verena Schott of Germany.

In 2020 she was at the Paralympic games in Tokyo where she competed in freestyle and breaststroke. She made the finals at several events but did not finish with a medal.

Honours
The world's largest trade union, the All-China Federation of Trade Unions, gave her the National May 1st Labour Medal.

References

Paralympic swimmers of China
Swimmers at the 2012 Summer Paralympics
Swimmers at the 2016 Summer Paralympics
Swimmers at the 2020 Summer Paralympics
Living people
1996 births
Paralympic gold medalists for China
Paralympic silver medalists for China
Paralympic bronze medalists for China
Medalists at the 2012 Summer Paralympics
Medalists at the 2016 Summer Paralympics
S6-classified Paralympic swimmers
Sportspeople from Shandong
Paralympic medalists in swimming
Chinese female freestyle swimmers
Chinese female backstroke swimmers
Chinese female breaststroke swimmers
Chinese female medley swimmers
Medalists at the World Para Swimming Championships
21st-century Chinese women
Medalists at the 2018 Asian Para Games